Five Men in a Hut is a 2006 compilation album by the British band Gomez. It covers their output from 1998 to 2004 when they were with Virgin Records.

Track listing
Disc 1
"Whipping Piccadilly" (Turbo version)
"The Best in Town"
"Catch Me Up (Edit)"
"Pick Up the Pieces"
"Royalty"
"We Haven't Turned Around"
"Coltrane (From Shot Shot, Part 1)"
"ZYX"
"78 Stone Wobble!"
"Flight"
"Chicken Bones"
"Blind"
"Old School Shirt"
"Sweet Virginia"
"Air Hostess Song"
"Ping One Down"
"Big Man"
"Old China" (Previously unreleased)

Disc 2
"Rhythm and Blues Alibi" (Pre-Mellotron version)
"Silhouettes"
"Dire Tribe"
"Bring It On" (Radio edit)
"Mississippi Bo Weevil Blues"
"Butterfly"
"Silence"
"Pussyfootin'"
"Step Inside"
"Shot Shot"
"Champagne for Monkeys"
"So"
"Tanglin'"
"Get Myself Arrested"
"Sound of Sounds" (Single version)
"M57"
"Pop Juice"
"Diskoloadout" (Previously unreleased)

Charts

References

Gomez (band) albums
Albums produced by Tchad Blake
2006 compilation albums
Virgin Records compilation albums